Peter Meiszner is a Canadian politician, who was elected to Vancouver City Council in the 2022 Vancouver municipal election. He is a member of ABC Vancouver.

Originally from Nanaimo, British Columbia, Meiszner moved to Vancouver in 2002 after facing difficulty with his family when he came out as gay. To make ends meet, he worked several jobs, including at Hudson's Bay menswear department at the Bay Building in downtown Vancouver. He studied broadcast journalism at the British Columbia Institute of Technology, and worked as a television journalist for Global BC before leaving to join the University of British Columbia as a senior digital strategist and communications manager. He was also the publisher of urbanYVR, a website focused on housing and urban development issues in the Lower Mainland. During this time, he served as vice-chair of the Gastown Historic Area Planning Committee.

Upon assuming office as a Vancouver city councillor, he was appointed as an alternate representative to the Metro Vancouver Regional District board, as well as appointments to the board of the Vancouver Public Library, Federation of Canadian Municipalities and EasyPark.

References

External links

21st-century Canadian politicians
Vancouver city councillors
LGBT municipal councillors in Canada
Canadian television reporters and correspondents
Gay politicians
British Columbia Institute of Technology alumni
People from Nanaimo
Living people
1983 births
21st-century Canadian LGBT people
Canadian gay men